Wild Pigeon (also known as Someone Else's White and the Speckled and The Stray White And The Speckled) is a 1986 Soviet drama film written and directed by Sergei Solovyov. It was entered into the main competition at the 43rd Venice International Film Festival, in which it won the Special Jury Prize. The film was selected as the Soviet entry for the Best Foreign Language Film at the 59th Academy Awards, but was not accepted as a nominee.

Plot   
The film takes place in the autumn of 1946, in a small provincial town in western Kazakhstan. A local teenager Ivan Naydenov (Vyacheslav Ilyushchenko) nicknamed as "The Gray", is a passionate pigeon enthusiast who recklessly risking his life manages to catch a white dove which has unexpectedly appeared in the city. Other pigeon hobbyists of the city find out of The Gray's spoil and the dove hunting begins. Soon the thieves kidnap the pigeon from The Gray's pen at night. The Gray begins to search for and find the dove from the local "pigeon authority" – Kolya the Gypsy (Vladimir Steklov). The Gray cunningly recaptures his prey and realizing that the dove is still doomed releases it to freedom. All the events of the film unfold against the backdrop of a meager post-war life of the inhabitants of the town - a place of exile and evacuation.

Cast
Vyacheslav Ilyushchenko as Ivan Naydenov "Gray"
Aleksandr Bashirov as "Freak"
Andrei Bitov as Pyotr Petrovich Startsev "Pepe" pianist, composer, ex-husband of Ksenia Nikolaevna
Arkady Vysotsky as brother of "Duffer"
Ilya Ivanov as Investigator Benjamin Jousse
Tatiana Ignatova as spectator in the theater under the open sky
Liubomiras Laucevičius as father of Ivan Naydenov
Boris Ryakhovskiy as Rakov
Ludmila Savelyeva as Xenia Nikolaevna Startseva, actress
Anatoly Slivnik as Colonel Pylypenko
Vladimir Steklov as Kolya's "Gypsy"
Bapov Sultan as Murat, friend of Ivan Naydenova, a student of Pyotr Petrovich
Vyacheslav Kuchanov as "Tushkan"
Mikhail Levchenko (II) as "Joker"
Sergey Mildenberger as   second brother of "Duffer"
Boris Olehnovich as Martyn
Andrey Filozov as Savitsky
German Schorr as Misha Nelyubov

See also
 List of submissions to the 59th Academy Awards for Best Foreign Language Film
 List of Soviet submissions for the Academy Award for Best Foreign Language Film

References

External links

1986 films
1986 drama films
Soviet drama films
1980s Russian-language films
Films directed by Sergei Solovyov
Films set in 1946
Films set in Kazakhstan
Venice Grand Jury Prize winners